The 1960 Nippon Professional Baseball season was the eleventh season of operation of Nippon Professional Baseball (NPB).

Regular season

Standings

Postseason

Japan Series

League leaders

Central League

Pacific League

Awards
Most Valuable Player
Noboru Akiyama, Taiyo Whales (CL)
Kazuhiro Yamauchi, Daimai Orions (PL)
Rookie of the Year
Ritsuo Horimoto, Yomiuri Giants (CL)
No PL recipient
Eiji Sawamura Award
Ritsuo Horimoto, Yomiuri Giants (CL)

See also
1960 Major League Baseball season

References